Rahme is a given name and surname. Notable people with the name include:

Given name
Rahme Haider (1886 – died after 1935), Syrian-born educator

Surname
Cheyne Rahme (born 1991), South African track and field athlete
Daniella Rahme (born 1990), Lebanese actress and TV presenter
Emile Rahme, Lebanese Maronite
Hanna Rahmé (born 1960), Lebanese Maronites
Joseph Rahme (born 1971), tennis player
Laurence Rahme , Lebanese medical professor
Laurice Rahmé, businesswoman
Michel Rahme, Lebanese alpine skier
Raymond Rahme (born 1945), South African poker player
Rudy Rahme (born 1967), Lebanese sculptor and painter

See also
Rahm (name), given name and surname